Fauladi Singh is  science fiction comic character in India in the decades of seventies and eighties, known as the protector of mankind. The comic was ahead of its times, at least, considering the cartoon/comic scene in India in the early eighties.

Plot summary
On a small island in the Indian Ocean was located the laboratory of Dr John, an exceptional scientist, who empowered Shekhar as Fauladi Singh alias Faulad with supernatural powers and gave him a costume that protected him on Earth and in Outer Space.

His friend, Lambu, who had turned miniature (barely nine inches) after drinking a potion made by Dr John, assists him in his space operations. Dr John, Faulad and Lambu along with Dorf rocket (that works on its own), master computers Bharat and Antarikshak, safeguard earth from aliens and attacks from other galaxies and neighbouring hostile planets.

Queen Rabunia of planet Techna is a major ally.

Fauladi Singh's love interest is Goddess Shafeena who he meets in Vinash Ke Pujari and Dhuen Ki Aurat.

Origin
The Fauladi Singh series was initially written by Rajiv in Diamond Comics and illustrated by Baldev Singh Sandhu. Anupam Sinha of Detective Kapil and Super Commando Dhruva took over from him. Later Ashu wrote it and the illustrations were made by Jugal Kishor.

Fauladi Singh Comics List

 Reprints Available.

Fauladi Singh Digest List

Fauladi Singh Mini Comic List

References

Indian comics
Superhero comics
Diamond Comics characters
Fictional Indian people